Dionne Bunsha is Climate and Conservation Engagement Coordinator at the University of British Columbia Botanical Gardens in Canada. She was a prominent journalist in India.

Background
Bunsha was born and raised in Mumbai, India. She completed a bachelor's degree in economics and commerce at the University of Mumbai, and a diploma in social communications media at the Sophia Polytechnic, Mumbai, in 1995. She has a master's degree in development studies from the London School of Economics (2000), and in 2008 Bunsha was awarded a prestigious John S. Knight Fellowship for journalism at Stanford University, USA. In mid-2009 she enrolled as a PhD student in environmental studies at Simon Fraser University in Canada, but graduated with a master's in resource and environment management in 2012. By 2010 she had moved into research on indigenous community conservation and cultural heritage, and lectured at Kwantlen Polytechnic University. From 2015 to 2021 she led the Lower Fraser Aboriginal Knowledge project, responding to oil spills and climate change, before joining the University of British Columbia.

Journalism
Bunshaa was a prominent journalist in India, mostly in the 1990s and 2000s, exposing suicide deaths among farmers, religious strife in India, human rights, threats to the Indian environment and a range of other crucial issues. She worked for The Times of India from 1995 to 1999, and then Frontline magazine from 2001 to 2008. Her published articles are on human rights, politics, wildlife conservation and climate change. More recently she has written for the Guardian, and the Toronto Star. She authored the prizewinning book, Scarred: Experiments with Violence in Gujarat (2006).

Awards
She was awarded two of the Ramnath Goenka Excellence in Journalism Awards in 2006-2007 for 'Environmental Reporting' and 'Books (Non-Fiction)', presented by the President of India A. P. J. Kalam; the International Federation of Journalists (IFJ) Journalism for Tolerance Prize for South Asia in 2005; the Sanskriti Award for Journalism in 2003; and the People's Union for Civil Liberties Human Rights Award in 2003.

References

Further reading
 Bunsha, D. 2006. Scarred: Experiments with Violence in Gujarat. Penguin Books India

External links
 of Dionne Bunsha

Year of birth missing (living people)
Living people
Alumni of the London School of Economics
Indian women journalists
Journalists from Maharashtra
Sophia Polytechnic alumni
Writers from Mumbai
Indian investigative journalists
Women writers from Maharashtra
The Times of India journalists
21st-century Indian women writers
21st-century Indian writers
21st-century Indian journalists
20th-century Indian women writers
20th-century Indian journalists